Obaida Al-Samarneh (born 17 February 1992) is a Jordanian professional footballer who plays as a midfielder for Jordanian club Al-Salt and the Jordan national team.

International career 
He played his first match with the Jordan national senior team against Lebanon in an international friendly on 31 August 2016, which resulted in a 1–1 draw.

Career statistics

International

References

External links 
 jo.gitsport.net
 

Association football midfielders
Jordan international footballers
Al-Faisaly SC players
1992 births
Jordanian footballers
Living people
Al-Ahli SC (Amman) players
Kufrsoum SC players
Ittihad Al-Zarqa players
2019 AFC Asian Cup players
Al-Salt SC players
Jordanian Pro League players